Miss Colombia 2014 was the 62nd edition of the Miss Colombia pageant. It was held on November 17, 2014 in Cartagena, Colombia. 

At the end of the event, Paulina Vega of Atlántico crowned Ariadna Gutiérrez of Sucre as Miss Colombia 2015. She represented Colombia in Miss Universe 2015 and placed 1st Runner-Up. On this year, the pageant celebrated 80 years of history.

Results

Color keys 

  The contestant was a Finalist/Runner-up in an International pageant.
 The contestant was a Semi-Finalist in an International pageant.
  The contestant did not place.

Scores

Specials Awards

Delegates 
26 delegates have been selected to compete.

Debuts 
   Bucaramanga A.M.

Returns 
   Sucre - Ariadna Gutiérrez was Miss Sucre 2013 and is supposed to represent her department last year, but did not compete due to personal reasons.

Withdrawals 
  Nariño - Leydi Carolina Carvajal, Miss Nariño 2014 withdrew due to a second degree sprain to her right ankle. Therefore, the department did not participate in this year's contest but was invited to all special events.

Replacements 
  Antioquia - Natalia Ochoa, 1st Runner-Up of Señorita Antioquia 2014, replaced Paola Builes Aristizábal.
  Chocó - Andrea Tovar was appointed as Señorita Chocó 2014 and was registered at the national competition supported by the Miss Colombia 2001, Vanessa Alexandra Mendoza Bustos, while Iliam Fariza Zapata was chosen by the competition chaired by the Departmental Committee, which makes the department having two titleholders. After several meetings at the head of the National Competition Policy, it is decided that Iliam Fariza Zapata will participate this year, while Andrea Tovar will participate next year. Tovar later became Miss Colombia 2015.
 Córdoba - María Eugenia Baglio Doria replaced Señorita Córdoba 2014, Leidy Carolina Espinosa Galván who got dethroned.
 Magdalena - Yesica Paola Morán Hernández, 1st Runner-Up of Señorita Magdalena 2014 replaced, Estefany Lizeth Orozco Amel due to a severe relapse in her health. She had medical complications that made it impossible for her to compete.

References

External links
 Official site

Miss Colombia
2014 in Colombia
2014 beauty pageants